Raushiq is a village in the municipality of Peja.

Notes

References 

Villages in Peja